John Cullen Murphy, Jr. (born September 1, 1952) is an American writer, journalist and editor who was managing editor of The Atlantic magazine from 1985 to 2006.

He was born in New Rochelle, New York, in 1952, a son of illustrator and cartoonist John Cullen Murphy. He grew up in Greenwich, Connecticut. His family moved to Dublin, Ireland for several years, including 1966, the 50th anniversary of the Easter Revolution.      

He was educated at Amherst College, from which he graduated with honors in medieval history in 1974. Murphy's first magazine job was in the paste-up department of Change, a magazine devoted to higher education.
 
He became an editor of The Wilson Quarterly in 1977.  From the mid-1970s until 2004 he worked with his father, John Cullen Murphy, as writer for the comic strip Prince Valiant, for which his father produced the artwork.  He is also the author of The Word According to Eve: Women and the Bible in Ancient Times and Our Own (1999); Are We Rome? (2007), which compares the politics and culture of Ancient Rome with that of the contemporary United States; God's Jury: The Inquisition and the Making of the Modern World (2012); and Cartoon County: My Father and His Friends in the Golden Age of Make-Believe (2017), a history of the cartoonists and illustrators from the Connecticut School.

He currently serves as editor at large for Vanity Fair and lives in Massachusetts. He is on the advisory board of the literary magazine The Common, based at Amherst College. He has three children: Jack, Anna, and Tim.

Publications

References

External links

Murphy bio at TheAtlantic.com
Archive of stories by Murphy at TheAtlantic.com
Video of debate/discussion with Cullen Murphy and Rod Dreher on Bloggingheads.tv

1952 births
Living people
American comics writers
American magazine editors
American male journalists
Amherst College alumni
Writers from New Rochelle, New York
The Atlantic (magazine) people
Vanity Fair (magazine) people
Writers from Connecticut
Journalists from New York (state)